The Reichstag (officially:  –) is a historic government building in Berlin which houses the Bundestag, the lower house of Germany's parliament.

The Reichstag was constructed to house the Imperial Diet of the German Empire. It was opened in 1894 and housed the Diet until 1933, when it was set on fire. In World War II, during the Battle of Berlin, the building was severely damaged by the Soviet Red Army.

The ruined building was made safe against the elements and partially refurbished in the 1960s, but no attempt at full restoration was made until after German reunification in 1990, when it underwent a reconstruction led by architect Norman Foster. After its completion in 1999, it once again became the meeting place of the German parliament: the contemporary Bundestag.

Etymology
The term , when used to connote a diet, dates back to the Holy Roman Empire. The building was built for the Diet of the German Empire, which was succeeded by the Reichstag of the Weimar Republic. The latter would become the Reichstag of Nazi Germany, which left the building (and ceased to act as a parliament) after the 1933 fire and never returned, using the Kroll Opera House instead; the term  has not been used by German parliaments since World War II. In today's usage, the word  (Imperial Diet) refers mainly to the building, while  (Federal Diet) refers to the institution.

History of the building

Imperial and Weimar Republic eras

Construction of the building began well after the unification of Germany in 1871. In 1872 an architectural contest with 103 participating architects was carried out to erect a new building, a contest won by Ludwig Bohnstedt. Unfortunately, that property was unavailable at the time.

In 1882, another architectural contest was held, with 200 architects participating. This time, the winner—the Frankfurt architect Paul Wallot—would actually see his Neo-Baroque project executed. The direct model for Wallot's design was Philadelphia's Memorial Hall, the main building of the 1876 Centennial Exhibition. Wallot adorned the building's façade with crowns and eagles symbolising imperial strength. The building's four corner towers represented the four German kingdoms at unification, Prussia, Bavaria, Saxony and Württemberg, and the heraldic coat of arms of each kingdom, as well as smaller devices representing various German city-states, flanked the main entrance, celebrating the process of unification. Some of the Reichstag's decorative sculptures, reliefs, and inscriptions were by sculptor Otto Lessing.

On 29 June 1884, the foundation stone was finally laid by Wilhelm I, at the east side of the Königsplatz. Before construction was completed by Philipp Holzmann A.G. in 1894, Wilhelm I died (in 1888, the Year of Three Emperors). His eventual successor, Wilhelm II, took a more jaundiced view of parliamentary democracy than his grandfather. The original building was acclaimed for the construction of an original cupola of steel and glass, considered an engineering feat at the time. But its mixture of architectural styles drew widespread criticism.

In 1916 the iconic words  ("To the German People") were placed above the main façade of the building, much to the displeasure of Wilhelm II, who had tried to block the adding of the inscription for its democratic significance. During the revolutionary days of 1918, two days before World War I ended and just hours after Wilhelm's abdication was announced, Philipp Scheidemann proclaimed the institution of a republic from one of the balconies of the  building on 9 November. Up to 42 protesters died during the Reichstag Bloodbath of 13 January 1920, when workers tried to protest against a law that would restrict their rights; it was the bloodiest demonstration in German history.

Nazi period

Following the Reichstag fire on 27 February 1933, the building was not used for parliamentary sessions for the next 12 years of Nazi rule. Instead, the nearby Kroll Opera House was used, and the Reichstag building became the setting for political exhibitions. In 1939 the library and archive were moved elsewhere, and the windows bricked up as the building was made into a fortress. By 1943, the building was used as a hospital, and a radio tube manufacturing facility by AEG. During the Battle of Berlin in 1945, it became one of the central targets for the Red Army to capture, due to its perceived symbolic significance.

Cold War
When the Cold War emerged, the building was physically within West Berlin, but in ruins.

In 1956, after some debate, the West German government decided that the  should not be torn down, but be restored instead under the guidance of Paul Baumgarten. The cupola of the original building, which had also been heavily damaged in the war, was dismantled, and the outside façade made simpler with the removal of ornaments and statues. Reconstruction started in 1961, and was complete by 1971.

The artistic and practical value of his work was the subject of much debate after German reunification. This prohibition was obeyed even though East Germany had declared East Berlin its capital, violating this provision. Until 1990, the building was thus used only for occasional representative meetings, and one-off events, such as a free concert given by British rock band Barclay James Harvest on 30 August 1980. It was also used for a widely lauded permanent exhibition about German history called  ("Questions on German history").

Reunification

The official German reunification ceremony on 3 October 1990, was held at the  building, including Chancellor Helmut Kohl, President Richard von Weizsäcker, former Chancellor Willy Brandt and many others. The event included huge firework displays. The following day the parliament of the united Germany assembled as a symbolic act in the  building.

However, at that time, the role of Berlin had not yet been decided upon. Only after a fierce debate, considered by many as one of the most memorable sessions of parliament, on 20 June 1991, did the  conclude with quite a slim majority in favour of both government and parliament returning to Berlin from Bonn.
On 21 June 1994, Norman Foster was asked to include a dome solution in his draft reconstruction proposal, which he included in his 10 February 1995 plans.
 

Before reconstruction began, the Reichstag was wrapped by the Bulgarian-American artists Christo and his wife Jeanne-Claude in 1995, attracting millions of visitors. The project was financed by the artists through the sale of preparatory drawings and collages, as well as early works of the 1950s and 1960s.

During the reconstruction, the building was first almost completely gutted, taking out everything except the outer walls, including all changes made by Baumgarten in the 1960s. Respect for the historic aspects of the building was one of the conditions stipulated to the architects, so traces of historical events were to be retained in a visible state. Among them were bullet holes and graffiti left by Soviet soldiers after the final battle for Berlin in April–May 1945. However, graffiti considered offensive was removed, in agreement with Russian diplomats at the time.

Reconstruction was completed in 1999, with the Bundestag convening there officially for the first time on 19 April of that year. The  is now the second most visited attraction in Germany, not least because of the huge glass dome that was erected on the roof as a gesture to the original 1894 cupola, giving an impressive view over the city, especially at night.

Dome

The large glass dome at the very top of the Reichstag has a 360-degree view of the surrounding Berlin cityscape. The main hall (debating chamber) of the parliament below can also be seen from inside the dome, and natural light from above radiates down to the parliament floor. A large sun shield tracks the movement of the sun electronically and blocks direct sunlight which would not only cause large solar gain, but dazzle those below. The dome is open to visitors by prior registration.

See also
List of legislative buildings
Band des Bundes
Christo and Jeanne-Claude
National Diet Building of Japan
Reichskanzlei
Reichstag (disambiguation)

Notes

 - Total pages: 687 
 - Total pages: 252

External links

Website of the German parliament
of the German Reichstags building in Berlin
Wrapped Reichstag
Photos of the Reichstag from 1989 and Photos of the 1945 Battle for the Reichstag.
Article in Exberliner Magazine 
Reichstag and vicinity at dawn, July 1971. From the "Berlin 1969" website.
Panoramic view of The Reichstag (building)

 
Government buildings completed in 1894
Buildings and structures in Berlin
Tourist attractions in Berlin
Legislative buildings in Europe
Foster and Partners buildings
Landmarks in Germany
Government buildings with domes
Rebuilt buildings and structures in Berlin
Seats of national legislatures
Buildings and structures destroyed by arson
Attacks on government buildings and structures
Government buildings in Germany